Mirko Deflorian (born 19 May 1980) is a former Italian World Cup alpine ski racer.

Biography
He retired from competitions in 2013, however in 2014 Deflorian cherished the dream of participating in his first Olympics, becoming naturalized and thus obtaining the qualification for Moldava at the 2014 Winter Olympics. But in the end he gave up the participation motivating him with the poor results obtained.

World Championship results

References

External links
 

1980 births
Living people
Italian male alpine skiers
Moldovan male alpine skiers
Alpine skiers of Fiamme Gialle
Doping cases in alpine skiing